Kapitän is the German word for Captain. It is also a shortened version of several ranks in the German navy, ranging from Korvettenkapitän to Kapitän zur See. The general meaning is equivalent to Captain.

References 

Military ranks of Germany
German words and phrases
Naval ranks of Germany